Vladimir Stankin (born 2 January 1974) is a Russian race walker.

Achievements

External links 

1974 births
Living people
Russian male racewalkers